Datura is an Italian electronic music group. It was created in 1991 by the musicians Ciro Pagano and Stefano Mazzavillani (ex-members of the 1980s-era Italian electro pop group Gaznevada) and the DJs Ricci (Riccardo Testoni) who is now deceased, and Cirillo (Carlo Andrea Raggi), who continues to work in Italy, Ibiza, Morocco, and England.  The first single was "Nu Style", in the summer of 1991, followed by "Yerba Del Diablo", a cover of Visage's "Fade to Grey", and "Eternity". With "Angeli Domini", in 1995, DJ Ricci left the group for other more independent projects. In 1997, their "Voo-Doo Believe?" reached number 17 on Hot Dance Club Songs. The name "Datura" is taken from a hallucinogenic plant.

Discography

Singles

References

External links
Datura information and discography

Italian electronic music groups
Italian house music groups